1939 in professional wrestling describes the year's events in the world of professional wrestling.

List of notable promotions 
Only one promotion held notable shows in 1939.

Calendar of notable shows

Championship changes

EMLL

Debuts
Debut date uncertain:
Gladys Gillem
Mae Young
July 4  Buddy Rogers

Births
Date of birth unknown
Paul LeDuc (wrestler)
February 9  Espectro I(died in 1993)
February 13  Lumberjack Pierre
February 26  Chuck Wepner
February 28  Dewey Robertson(died in 2007)
March 1  Adnan Al-Kaissie
March 13  Rodolfo Ruíz
March 14  Lars Anderson
March 20  Paul Christy(died in 2021)
March 24  Jim Herd
May 5  Bill Watts
June 8  Tinieblas Sr.
August 8  Michael Okpala (died in 2004) 
October 3  Bob Armstrong(died in 2020) 
October 4  Gene Anderson(died in 1991)
October 20  Gil Hayes (died in 2022) 
November 1  Fred Peloquin
December 14  Roger Kirby (wrestler)(died in 2019)
December 25  Ivan Gomes (died in 1990)

Deaths
March 11  William Miller (Australian athlete) (92)

References

 
professional wrestling